The Battle of Aranzueque was a military confrontation at the village of Aranzueque, Spain, on 19 September 1837, during the First Carlist War.

The battle pitted the troops of the pretender to the Spanish crown, Carlos V, against the troops of the Queen Regent Maria Christina, led by the general Baldomero Espartero.

The loyalist troops had attacked the Carlists at Alcalá de Henares and pushed them through Alcarria towards Aranzueque.  On September 19, the loyalists pressed a final attack upon the tired and depleted Carlists at Aranzueque.  Espartero succeeded in taking the village, with the artillery bombardment causing the full rout of the Carlists.  This victory for the loyalists definitively ended the Carlist campaign known as the Expedición Real.

September 1837 events
1837 in Spain
Conflicts in 1837
Battles of the First Carlist War
Battles in Castilla–La Mancha
History of the province of Guadalajara